is a Japanese actor who is represented by the talent agency, JFCT.

Biography
Abe was a member of a baseball team at Seijoh High School, and belongs to a hardball baseball team in Aichi University, which they won the 17th All Japan University Quasi Baseball Tournament.

He started his career in Water Boys 2. Abe's work was increased in television dramas. His roles were like yazukas and Yankee Kowaomote, but he has comical roles in dramas such as Astro Kyūdan and My Boss My Hero. By taking advantage of his skills, Abe often plays baseball players.

Filmography

TV series

Film

References

External links
Official profile 
 

Japanese male actors
1980 births
Living people
Actors from Aichi Prefecture
People from Chita, Aichi
Aichi University alumni